Libertine is the third full-length studio album by indie rock band Silkworm. It was released in 1994 on El Recordo. It was their last recorded release before guitarist/vocalist Joel RL Phelps left the band.

A remastered and expanded 2x12" + CD reissue of the record, including the group's Marco Collins Sessions EP and two additional tracks, was issued by Comedy Minus One in May 2014.

Production
The album was recorded over three days with Steve Albini.

Critical reception
Trouser Press wrote that "although it still emphasizes snap and crackle over pop, Libertine is slightly more immediate than its predecessors." Magnet called "Couldn't You Wait?" a "lost classic" of the era; the track provided the title to the 2013 documentary film about the band. Paste called the album "a favorite with Silkworm afficionados," writing that the album is "strong" but that the "grunge-fallout muddiness sounds dated."

Track listing

Personnel
Steve Albini—Engineer
Andy Cohen—Guitar, Vocals on 1 & 2
Joel RL Phelps—Guitar, Vocals on 4, 5, 6, & 8
Michael Dahlquist—Drums
Tim Midyett—Bass, Vocals on 3, 7, 9, 10, & 11

References

1994 albums
Silkworm (band) albums
Albums produced by Steve Albini